Children and Youth Services Review is a monthly multidisciplinary journal covering the study of social service programs pertaining to children and youth. It was established in 1979 by Pergamon Press and is currently published by Elsevier, which acquired Pergamon in 1991. The editors are Elizabeth Fernandez, Michelle Johnson-Motoyama, Darcey H. Merritt, Aron Shlonsky. According to the Journal Citation Reports, the journal has a 2020 impact factor of 2.393.

References

External links

Multidisciplinary social science journals
Publications established in 1979
Monthly journals
Elsevier academic journals
English-language journals